Auaxa is a genus of moths in the family Geometridae.

Species
Auaxa cesadaria Walker, 1860
Auaxa kaluga Swinhoe 1900
Auaxa lanceolata Inoue 1992
Auaxa mimosina Inoue, 1992
Auaxa sulphurea (Butler 1878)

Ennominae
Geometridae genera